Hyperspace Delivery Boy! is a puzzle action game released for the Pocket PC on December 23, 2001. It was ported to Microsoft Windows and Linux. The game was the first title released Monkeystone Games, a small developer formed by id Software and Ion Storm founders John Romero and Tom Hall, and Romero's then-girlfriend Stevie Case. Much of the gameplay involves solving Sokoban-like puzzles.

Plot

Hyperspace Delivery Boy! follows the story of Guy Carrington, a courier in training. Guy is sent by Sergeant Filibuster on several dangerous missions in four different locations. During the course of the game, Guy discovers a secret organization known as "THEM".

External links

2001 video games
Linux games
Cancelled Game Boy Advance games
Puzzle video games
Video games developed in the United States
Windows games
Windows Mobile games
MacOS games
Lua (programming language)-scripted video games
ScummVM-supported games
Linux Game Publishing games
Single-player video games
Monkeystone Games games